Bluebell Wood can mean:
 a bluebell wood, an area of woodland that contains large numbers of flowering bluebells
 Bluebell Wood, London, an ancient woodland that does not, actually, contain any bluebells
 Garscadden Wood, a nature reserve north of Glasgow commonly called "Bluebell Wood"